Carbubarb (Carbubarbital, trade name Nogexan) is a carbamate-substituted barbiturate derivative, which has sedative effects.

References 

Barbiturates
Carbamates
GABAA receptor positive allosteric modulators